Øyvinn Øi (19 June 1901 in Hadsel, Vesterålen – 9 April 1940) was a Norwegian military officer during the outbreak of the Second World War.

Personal life
Øyvinn Øi was born in Hadsel, the son of lector Gunnar Øi and Thora, née Lind. In 1926 he married Aagot Hesselborg, with whom he had four children.

Career
After his examen artium Øi took an officer exam attending the Norwegian Military Academy. He also did military studies in France.

Øi, a captain in the general staff, became known to the general public for his lecture entitled "Det strategiske overfall" ('The Strategic Attack') to the officers' society, Oslo Militære Samfund, on 6 March 1939. In this lecture, Øi stated that Norway had inadequate defences and was vulnerable to a foreign attack.  This caused a stir in some groups, especially the social democrat newspaper Arbeiderbladet, which came close to accusing him of treason.

Norway was indeed invaded when Operation Weserübung reached the country on 9 April 1940. Øi was killed on the same day at a road block set up by German forces at Grorud. He had volunteered to go on a mission to Oslo on behalf of the Norwegian general staff after the staff had evacuated from the Norwegian capital.

References

1901 births
1940 deaths
People from Hadsel
Norwegian Military Academy alumni
Norwegian expatriates in France
Norwegian Army personnel of World War II
Norwegian military personnel killed in World War II
Deaths by firearm in Norway